Paul Chun (born 26 June 1945) is a Hong Kong actor. He has appeared in more than 130 films and television series since 1949. In 1966, he appeared in The Sand Pebbles, an American film produced and directed by Robert Wise.

Early life 
He was born as Chiang Chang-nien in Shanghai, China on 26 June 1945. His father was Yan Fa (嚴化). His mother was Hung Wei (紅薇). Both of his parents were renowned actors.

He is the older brother of actor David Chiang and older half-brother of actor/ director Derek Yee Tung-Shing. His son Benji Chiang and his daughter Lesley Chiang are duo in the pop group "Benji and Lesley".

Family
 Father: Yan Fa (嚴化)
 Mother: Hung Wei (紅薇)
 Brother: David Chiang, Derek Yee (half brother)
 Sister: Yim Wai (嚴慧)
 Ex-Wife: Thelma Leung (梁盛子)
 Children: Benji Chiang (姜文杰), Lesley Chiang (姜麗文)

Career 
In 1949, at age three, Chun started his acting career as a child-actor. From 1949 to 1954, Chun appeared in many films such as Chun lei (1949) directed by Li Pingqian and Dang fu xin (1949) directed by Feng Yueh (aka Griffin Yueh Feng) .

In 1966, Chun (credited as Paul Chinpae) appeared as Cho-jen in The Sand Pebbles (1966), an American film produced and directed by Robert Wise. In The Sand Pebbles, Chun was a young militant student killed by Machinist's Mate 1st Class Jake Holman (played by Steve McQueen).

Chun has continuously acted for over 60 years. He is highly respected by many actors of his generation and also regarded as one of the greatest actors in Hong Kong of all time.

In 2010, Chun was the director with Cheyton Jain as co-director in The Chair, the Box, and the Broom (2010), a short film. In 2011, Chun was the director of Earth (2011), an animation short film about a giant robot shooting at some buildings.

Filmography

Television series

Feature film

References

External links
 Paul Chun at Hong Kong Cinemagic
 
 Paul Chun at chinesemov.com
 

Hong Kong male television actors
Hong Kong male film actors
Hong Kong people of Manchu descent
Hong Kong people of Mongolian descent
Male actors from Shanghai
Manchu male actors
Living people
TVB veteran actors
1945 births
20th-century Hong Kong male actors
21st-century Hong Kong male actors